Jean Benoît-Lévy (1888–1959) was a French film director and producer.

Selected filmography
 Heart of Paris (1932)
 Hélène (1936)
 Ballerina (1937)
 Fire in the Straw (1939)

References

Bibliography
 Andrews, Dudley. Mists of Regret: Culture and Sensibility in Classic French Film. Princeton University Press, 1995.

External links

1888 births
1959 deaths
French film producers
20th-century French screenwriters
Film directors from Paris